Sarah Mariegaard (born December 1988 in Zealand, Denmark), known professionally as Soleima, is a Danish singer-songwriter.

History 
In 2014, Mariegaard established herself as a solo artist under the name Soleima, before her solo carrier she was a member of the Danish hip hop collective Flødeklinikken. Her first single "My Boi" was released June 14, 2015. In 2017 her first EP NO. 14 was released following the release of three singles from the album :"Once Was", "Wasted", and "Breathe" (feat. Kranium & Hoodboi). The track "Cracks" from the EP NO. 14 was recognized as P3s Uundgåelige ("P3 Unavoidable"), in the week beginning on January 16, 2017, making it one of the most played songs on the Danish national radio channel P3 that week. Her single "Low Life" from the EP Bulldog was recognized as P3s Uundgåelige ("P3 Unavoidable"), in the week beginning on January 15, 2018. In 2020, her first studio album Powerslide was released and she had her first US tour.

Discography

Albums

Extended plays

Awards and nominations

Årets Steppeulv Awards

MTV Europe Music Awards

P3 Guld Awards

Danish Music Awards

GAFFA-Prisen Awards

References 

Danish hip hop musicians
Danish pop musicians
Danish women singer-songwriters
1988 births
Living people
21st-century Danish women singers